Arnona may also refer to Israeli property tax

Arnona is an upscale neighborhood in southern Jerusalem, situated between the neighborhood of Talpiot and kibbutz Ramat Rachel.

Etymology
The most common explanation for the neighborhood's name is its view of the biblical River Arnon, now Wadi Mujib in Jordan, running from the Moab Hills to the Dead Sea.

Geography
Arnona is one of the highest points in Jerusalem at 800 meters above sea level. From Arnona one can see the Judean Desert, the Dead Sea, and, as mentioned, the River Arnon/Wadi Mujib. The neighborhood is bordered by the Hebron Road/Derech Hevron and Talpiot neighbourhood to the west, Kibbutz Ramat Rachel to the south, Old Talpiot to the north, and the Judean desert to the east.

History

Antiquity
In 2020, the remains of a large Iron Age II compound were discovered near the US Embassy. The site served for the collection and storage of taxes in the form of agricultural produce, and was first used during the reign of two biblical  kings of Judah, Hezekiah and Manasseh (together they ruled from c. 715-643).

Zionist settlement, beginnings
Arnona was founded in 1931 on land owned by the Keren HaEzra company according to plans created by the architect Richard Kauffmann. In 1935, another neighbourhood named “Binyan v’Melacha” was founded alongside Talpiot; this neighborhood has since been incorporated into the Arnona area. Together with other nearby Jewish areas (Talpiot and Mekor Chaim), Arnona gradually became a southern suburb of Jerusalem separated from the main city by the Arab neighborhoods of Baka and Talbieh, and the German Colony area.

1948-1967 events
During the 1948 Arab-Israeli War, Arnona was on the front line. In May 1948, Arnona was occupied by Arab forces. An attack by Egyptian, Jordanian, and local Arab troops led to a retreat by Jewish forces from Arnona and Ramat Rachel. A combined unit of the Hagana and Palmach later retook the area.

The 1949 cease fire agreement with Jordan placed the cease-fire line at the eastern border of Arnona. This cease fire line was part of the "Kav Ironi", the Jerusalem section of the Green line separating the Jordanian and Israeli armies. The border was patrolled by a dedicated force, but the only physical barrier was an unguarded barbed-wire fence. With the Six-Day War in 1967, Arnona gained its current borders.

Post-1967 evolution
In 1970, Yeshivas Mercaz  Hatorah, a post high school yeshiva for students from the diaspora, was opened on Rechov Ein Tsurim by its founder Rabbi Aryeh Rottman.

Until the 1990s, Arnona was similar in nature to the Old Talpiot area. During the 1990s, a widespread building trend led to a rise in property value and made Arnona into a relatively upscale neighborhood. Buildings in the area are generally no more than six stories in height. Today, virtually all plots of land in Arnona are occupied. Much of the land currently built on was sold to developers by Kibbutz Ramat Rachel.

The United States Embassy to Israel moved to Arnona, May, 14, 2018. Previously, the building had been designated as the US Consulate General in Jerusalem. On February 23, 2018, the Trump Administration announced that the United States Embassy to Israel would relocate to the Arnona premises of the Consulate General by May 14 to coincide with the 70th anniversary of the Israeli Declaration of Independence. The interim Embassy in Arnona contains office space for the US Ambassador and a small staff. There are plans to open a new Embassy annex on the Arnona compound in 2019 while the search for a permanent embassy site continues.

References

Neighbourhoods of Jerusalem